The 28th Annual Grammy Awards were held on February 25, 1986, at Shrine Auditorium, Los Angeles. They recognized accomplishments by musicians from the previous year, 1985. The night's big winner was USA For Africa's "We Are The World", which won four awards, including Song of the Year which went to Michael Jackson and Lionel Richie. It marked the first time in their respective careers that they received the Song of the Year Award. For Richie, it was his sixth attempt in eight years. The other three awards (including Record of the Year) for the latter single were given to the song's producer, Quincy Jones.

Another big winner was Phil Collins, whose No Jacket Required LP amassed three wins: Album of the Year (alongside Hugh Padgham), Producer of the Year and Best Pop Vocal (Male). The Manhattan Transfer also won three awards, including two for the song "Another Night in Tunisia" (performed and arranged on the album by guest vocalists Jon Hendricks and Bobby McFerrin).

Stevie Wonder won his first Grammy in nine years for his album In Square Circle, after winning fifteen awards in the mid-1970s. While songwriter Jimmy Webb won him his first Grammy in 17 years for his song "Highwayman" (after 1969's Up, Up and Away). Orchestrator and arranger Nelson Riddle, posthumously won for his arrangements on Linda Ronstadt's album Lush Life. There was one new category, Best Polka Recording. It would run until 2009.

Controversy 
There were a number of remarkable wins in the classical field. The Atlanta Symphony Orchestra's recording of Berlioz: Requiem won three awards, while a different recording by the same orchestra won the Best Orchestral Performance award. These four wins were the result of an unusually large number of nominations for the orchestra (12 in total), including four in the Best Classical Album category which normally holds five nominees (the Recording Academy decided to add a number of nominations to this list to lessen the domination of the Atlanta Symphony Orchestra in this category). 

Several sources from the American classical community - including record labels - expressed their dismay with the situation, suggesting that this was  the result of many members of the orchestra and other associates joining the Recording Academy in force to be able to vote on nominations and Grammy winners. Despite the controversy, the orchestra's conductor Robert Shaw and their album producer (and record label owner) Robert Woods won three Grammys each.

Performers

Award winners 
Record of the Year
"We Are the World" – USA for Africa
Quincy Jones, producers
"Money for Nothing" – Dire Straits
Neil Dorfsman & Mark Knopfler, producers
"The Boys of Summer" – Don Henley
Don Henley, Danny Kortchmar, Greg Ladanyi & Mike Campbell, producers
"The Power of Love" – Huey Lewis and the News
Huey Lewis and the News, producers
"Born in the U.S.A." – Bruce Springsteen
Jon Landau, Chuck Plotkin, Little Steven & Bruce Springsteen, producers
Album of the Year
No Jacket Required – Phil Collins
Hugh Padgham & Phil Collins, producers
Brothers in Arms – Dire Straits
Neil Dorfsman & Mark Knopfler, producers
Whitney Houston – Whitney Houston
Jermaine Jackson, Kashif, Michael Masser & Narada Michael Walden, producers
The Dream of the Blue Turtles – Sting
Sting & Rick Chertoff, producers
We Are the World – USA for Africa
Quincy Jones, producer
Song of the Year
"We Are the World"
Michael Jackson & Lionel Richie, songwriters (USA for Africa)
"Money for Nothing"
Mark Knopfler & Sting, songwriters (Dire Straits)
"The Boys of Summer"
Don Henley & Mike Campbell, songwriters (Don Henley)
"Everytime You Go Away"
Daryl Hall, songwriter (Paul Young)
"I Want to Know What Love Is"
Mick Jones, songwriter (Foreigner)
Best New Artist
Sade
A-ha
Freddie Jackson
Katrina and the Waves
Julian Lennon

Blues
Best Traditional Blues Recording
"My Guitar Sings the Blues" - B.B. King

Children's
Best Recording for Children
Jim Henson & Steve Buckingham (producers) for Follow That Bird - Original Motion Picture Soundtrack performed by the Sesame Street cast

Classical
Best Classical Orchestral Recording
Robert Woods (producer), Robert Shaw (conductor) & the Atlanta Symphony Orchestra for Fauré: Pelleas et Melisande
Best Classical Vocal Soloist Performance
Robert Shaw (conductor), John Aler & the Atlanta Symphony Orchestra for Berlioz: Requiem
Best Opera Recording
James Mallinson (producer), Georg Solti (conductor), Philip Langridge, Franz Mazura & the Chicago Symphony Orchestra & Chorus for Schoenberg: Moses und Aron
Best Choral Performance (other than opera)
Robert Shaw (conductor) & the Atlanta Symphony Orchestra & Chorus for Berlioz: Requiem
Best Classical Performance - Instrumental Soloist or Soloists (with orchestra)
André Previn (conductor), Yo-Yo Ma & the London Symphony Orchestra for Elgar: Cello Concerto, Op. 85/Walton: Concerto for Cello & Orchestra
Best Classical Performance - Instrumental Soloist or Soloists (without orchestra)
Vladimir Ashkenazy for Ravel: Gaspard de la Nuit; Pavane Pour Une Infante Defunte; Valses Nobles et Sentimentales      
Best Chamber Music Performance
Emanuel Ax & Yo-Yo Ma for Brahms: Cello and Piano Sonatas in E Minor and F 
Best Classical Contemporary Composition
Andrew Lloyd Webber (composer), Sarah Brightman & Plácido Domingo for Lloyd Webber: Requiem
Best Classical Album
Robert Woods (producer), Robert Shaw (conductor), John Aler & the Atlanta Symphony Orchestra & Chorus for Berlioz: Requiem
Best New Classical Artist
Chicago Pro Musica

Comedy
Best Comedy Recording
Whoopi Goldberg for Whoopi Goldberg - Original Broadway Show Recording

Composing and arranging
Best Instrumental Composition
Jan Hammer (composer) for "Miami Vice Theme"
Best Album of Original Score Written for a Motion Picture or a Television Special
Marc Benno, Harold Faltermeyer, Keith Forsey, Micki Free, Jon Gilutin, David "Hawk" Wolinski, Howard Hewett, Bunny Hull, Howie Rice, Sharon Robinson, Dan Sembello, Sue Sheridan, Richard C. Theisen II & Allee Willis (composers) for Beverly Hills Cop performed by various artists
Best Arrangement on an Instrumental
Dave Grusin & Lee Ritenour (arrangers) for "Early A.M. Attitude"      
Best Instrumental Arrangement Accompanying Vocalist(s)
Nelson Riddle (arranger) for "Lush Life" performed by Linda Ronstadt
Best Vocal Arrangement for Two or More Voices
Bobby McFerrin & Cheryl Bentyne (arrangers) for "Another Night in Tunisia" performed by The Manhattan Transfer

Country
Best Country Vocal Performance, Female
Rosanne Cash for "I Don't Know Why You Don't Want Me"
Best Country Vocal Performance, Male
Ronnie Milsap for "Lost in the Fifties Tonight (In the Still of the Night)"
Best Country Performance by a Duo or Group with Vocal
The Judds for Why Not Me
Best Country Instrumental Performance (orchestra, group or soloist)
Chet Atkins & Mark Knopfler for "Cosmic Square Dance"
Best Country Song
Jimmy L. Webb (songwriter) for "Highwayman" performed by Johnny Cash, Waylon Jennings, Kris Kristofferson & Willie Nelson

Folk
Best Ethnic or Traditional Folk Recording
Rockin' Sidney for "My Toot Toot"

Gospel
Best Gospel Performance, Female 
Amy Grant for Unguarded
Best Gospel Performance, Male 
Larnelle Harris for "How Excellent Is Thy Name"
Best Gospel Performance by a Duo or Group, Choir or Chorus
Larnelle Harris & Sandi Patti for "I've Just Seen Jesus"
Best Soul Gospel Performance, Female
Shirley Caesar for "Martin"
Best Soul Gospel Performance, Male
Marvin Winans for "Bring Back the Days of Yea and Nay"
Best Soul Gospel Performance by a Duo or Group, Choir or Chorus
The Winans for Tomorrow
Best Inspirational Performance
Jennifer Holliday for "Come Sunday"

Historical
Best Historical Album
John Pfeiffer (producer) for RCA/Met - 100 Singers - 100 Years performed by various artists

Jazz
Best Jazz Vocal Performance, Female
Cleo Laine for Cleo at Carnegie - The 10th Anniversary Concert
Best Jazz Vocal Performance, Male
Bobby McFerrin & Jon Hendricks for "Another Night in Tunisia"
Best Jazz Vocal Performance, Duo or Group
The Manhattan Transfer for Vocalese
Best Jazz Instrumental Performance, Soloist
Wynton Marsalis for Black Codes From the Underground
Best Jazz Instrumental Performance, Group
Wynton Marsalis for Black Codes From the Underground performed by the Wynton Marsalis Group
Best Jazz Instrumental Performance, Big Band
Bob Wilber & John Barry for The Cotton Club - Original Motion Picture Soundtrack
Best Jazz Fusion Performance, Vocal or Instrumental
David Sanborn for Straight To The Heart

Latin
Best Latin Pop Performance
Lani Hall for Es Facil Amar
Best Tropical Latin Performance
Eddie Palmieri for Solito
Tito Puente for Mambo Diablo performed by Tito Puente & His Latin Ensemble  
Best Mexican-American Performance
Vikki Carr for Simplemente Mujer

Musical show
Best Cast Show Album
John McClure (producer), José Carreras & Kiri Te Kanawa for West Side Story

Music video
Best Music Video, Short Form
Tom Trbovich (video director) & Quincy Jones (video producer) for "We Are the World - The Video Event" performed by USA for Africa
Best Music Video, Long Form
Bruce Gowers (video director) & Huey Lewis and the News for Huey Lewis & the News - The Heart of Rock 'n' Roll

Packaging and notes
Best Album Package
John Kosh & Ron Larson (art directors) for Lush Life performed by Linda Ronstadt
Best Album Notes
Peter Guralnick (notes writer) for Sam Cooke Live at the Harlem Square Club, 1963

Polka
Best Polka Recording
Frank Yankovic for 70 Years of Hits

Pop
Best Pop Vocal Performance, Female
Whitney Houston for "Saving All My Love for You"
Best Pop Vocal Performance, Male
Phil Collins for No Jacket Required
Best Pop Performance by a Duo or Group with Vocal
Quincy Jones (producer) for "We Are the World" performed by USA for Africa
Best Pop Instrumental Performance
Jan Hammer for "Miami Vice Theme"

Production and engineering
Best Engineered Recording, Non-Classical
Neil Dorfsman (engineer) for Brothers in Arms performed by Dire Straits
Best Engineered Recording, Classical
Jack Renner (engineer), Robert Shaw (conductor) & the Atlanta Symphony Orchestra & chorus for Berlioz: Requiem
Producer of the Year (Non-Classical)
Phil Collins & Hugh Padgham
Classical Producer of the Year
Robert Woods

R&B
Best R&B Vocal Performance, Female
Aretha Franklin for "Freeway of Love"
Best R&B Vocal Performance, Male
Stevie Wonder for In Square Circle
Best R&B Performance by a Duo or Group with Vocal
Commodores for "Nightshift"  
Best R&B Instrumental Performance (Orchestra, Group or Soloist)
Ernie Watts for Musician
Best Rhythm & Blues Song
Jeffrey Cohen & Narada Michael Walden (songwriters) for "Freeway of Love" performed by Aretha Franklin

Reggae
Best Reggae Recording
Jimmy Cliff for Cliff Hanger

Rock
Best Rock Vocal Performance, Female 
Tina Turner for "One Of The Living"
Best Rock Vocal Performance, Male
Don Henley for "The Boys of Summer"
Best Rock Performance by a Duo or Group with Vocal
Dire Straits for "Money for Nothing"
Best Rock Instrumental Performance
Jeff Beck for "Escape"

Spoken
Best Spoken Word or Non-musical Recording
Mike Berniker (producer) & the original Broadway cast for Ma Rainey's Black Bottom

Special awards 

 President's Merit Award
Prince

References

External links
28th Grammy Awards at the Internet Movie Database

 028
1986 in California
1986 music awards
1986 in Los Angeles
1986 in American music
Grammy
February 1986 events in the United States